A general election was held in the U.S. state of Oregon on November 3, 2020. Primary elections were held on May 19, 2020.

Federal

President of the United States

Former Democratic Vice President Joseph Biden beat incumbent Republican President Donald Trump, first elected in 2016, to receive Oregon's 7 electoral votes.

United States Senate

Incumbent Democratic Senator Jeff Merkley who was first elected in 2008 and re-elected in 2014 was re-elected for a third term in office.

United States House of Representatives

All five of Oregon's seats in the United States House of Representatives were up for re-election in 2020. These seats were currently represented by four Democrats and one Republican. In October 2019, incumbent Republican Representative Greg Walden of the 2nd district announced that he would not seek a twelfth term. All of the other incumbent Representatives won in their respective districts and Republican Cliff Bentz won in the 2nd district.

Attorney General

Incumbent Democratic Attorney General Ellen Rosenblum was originally appointed to the role by former Governor John Kitzhaber on June 29, 2012 to finish the term of her predecessor John Kroger, who resigned from office. She was elected to a full term in 2012 and re-elected in 2016. This office is not subject to term limits, and Rosenblum was reelected to a third full term.

Democratic primary

Declared candidates
Ellen Rosenblum, incumbent Attorney General

Results

Republican primary

Declared candidates
Michael Cross, professional driver and software designer, leader of an unsuccessful attempt to recall Governor Kate Brown in 2019

Withdrawn candidates
Daniel Zene Crowe, lawyer and Republican nominee for Attorney General in 2016 (withdrew candidacy effective March 13, 2020)

Results

General election

Secretary of State

Incumbent Republican Secretary of State Bev Clarno was originally appointed to the role by Governor Kate Brown on March 31, 2019 to finish the term of her predecessor, Dennis Richardson, who died in office. Brown announced that she was only interested in appointing a successor to Richardson who wanted the day-to-day responsibilities of the office and would not run for election to a full term, a condition to which Clarno agreed upon her appointment.

Republican primary

Declared candidates
Dave Stuaffer, environmental engineer, candidate for Governor of Oregon in 2016 (as a Democrat) and in 2018 (as a Republican)
Kim Thatcher, state Senator representing District 13

Declined
Rich Vial, former state Representative for District 26, former deputy Secretary of State

Endorsements

Results

Democratic primary

Declared candidates
Shemia Fagan, state Senator representing District 24
Mark Hass, state Senator representing District 14
Jamie McLeod-Skinner, environmental attorney and Democratic nominee for the 2018 election for Oregon's 2nd congressional district

Withdrawn candidates
Jamie Morrison (withdrew candidacy effective February 28, 2020 to run for District 18 in the Oregon House of Representatives)
Cameron Smith, former Director of Oregon Department of Consumer and Business Services and Oregon Department of Veterans' Affairs (withdrew candidacy effective March 10, 2020)
Jennifer Williamson, former Majority Leader of the Oregon House of Representatives and former state Representative for District 36 (withdrew candidacy effective February 26, 2020)
Ryan Wruck, office manager (withdrew candidacy effective November 8, 2019, endorsed Mark Hass)

Endorsements

Results

General election

State Treasurer

Incumbent Democratic State Treasurer Tobias Read, first elected in 2016, was reelected to a second term in office.

Democratic primary

Declared candidates
Tobias Read, incumbent State Treasurer

Results

Republican primary

Declared candidates
Jeff Gudman, former Lake Oswego City Councilor

Results

General election

Legislative

In the previous legislative session, Democrats held majority of 18–12 in the Senate and 38–22 in the House of Representatives. Of the 30 seats in the Senate, 16 were up for re-election. All 60 seats in the House of Representatives are up for re-election. After the election Democrats held majority 18–12 in the Senate and 37–23 in the House of Representatives.

Judicial

Supreme Court

Court of Appeals

Ballot measures
Measure 109 would legalize certain providers offering the therapeutic use of psilocybin mushrooms to individuals at least 21 years old.

Polling
Measure 109

See also
 Elections in Oregon
 Portland, Oregon mayoral election, 2020

Notes

References

External links
 Elections Division at the Oregon Secretary of State
 Oregon at Ballotpedia
 
 
  (State affiliate of the U.S. League of Women Voters)

Official campaign websites for Attorney General candidates
 Michael Cross (R) for Attorney General 
 Ellen Rosenblum (D) for Attorney General

Official campaign websites for Secretary of State candidates
 Shemia Fagan (D) for Secretary of State
 Kim Thatcher (R) for Secretary of State

Official campaign websites for State Treasurer candidates
 Jeff Gudman (R) for Treasurer
 Tobias Read (D) for Treasurer

 
Oregon
Oregon elections by year